Discovery Cove is a theme park owned and operated by SeaWorld Parks & Entertainment, and located in Orlando, Florida. It is the sister park of SeaWorld Orlando and Aquatica Orlando. Visitors to the park can interact with a range of marine animals including bottlenose dolphins.

Attractions 
The main experience at Discovery Cove is swimming with a dolphin, where visitors can "talk, touch, play and swim" with bottlenose dolphins.

The park contains a free-flight aviary, which contains over 250 tropical birds including parrots, toucans, and over 30 other species of exotic birds. The heated Tropical River runs through the aviary and circles the park, allowing guests to float past an assortment of the Discovery Cove's beaches, waterfalls, and rainforest landscape. The Tropical River runs into the park's freshwater resort pool.

In June 2011, the park expanded with the opening of The Grand Reef. This reef was needed due to the original reef having a persistent salt water leak, which affected the ground water, and replaced the original reef with Freshwater Oasis. The Grand Reef features a white-sand beach, palm-lined island and underwater grottos filled with moray eels, reef sharks and scores of other tropical fish. Activities range from snorkeling with eagle rays to crossing a rope bridge over a shark-filled lagoon.

In summer 2012, the park introduced the Freshwater Oasis. The area features water filled trails covered by a rainforest canopy that contains a viewing glass window featuring an exhibit for Asian small-clawed otters and an island in the center of the pool known as Primate Island containing White-headed marmosets.

Admission 
Discovery Cove admission is all-inclusive and options include tickets to SeaWorld Orlando, Aquatica Orlando, and Busch Gardens Tampa. Three different admission options are offered by the park, including the dolphin-swim, non-dolphin-swim and “Trainer for a Day” packages. Reservations for Discovery Cove are required and a maximum of 1300 guests can be present in the park at any one time. Discounts are often available for Florida Residents.

References

External links

 
 Discovery Cove Photo Gallery

2000 establishments in Florida
Amusement parks opened in 2000
Dolphinariums
Oceanaria in the United States
SeaWorld Parks & Entertainment
Zoos established in 2000